The large Lepidoptera family Hesperiidae (skippers) contains the following genera:

A B C D E F G H I J K L M N O P Q R S T U V W X Y Z

 Udaspes
 Udranomia
 Ulva
 Unkana
 Urbanus

References 

 Natural History Museum Lepidoptera genus database

Hesperiid genera U